Springfield Township, Pennsylvania may refer to:

Springfield Township, Bradford County, Pennsylvania
Springfield Township, Bucks County, Pennsylvania
Springfield Township, Delaware County, Pennsylvania
Springfield Township, Erie County, Pennsylvania
Springfield Township, Fayette County, Pennsylvania
Springfield Township, Huntingdon County, Pennsylvania
Springfield Township, Mercer County, Pennsylvania
Springfield Township, Montgomery County, Pennsylvania
Springfield Township, York County, Pennsylvania

See also  
Springfield (disambiguation)

Pennsylvania township disambiguation pages